The Sukhoi Su-30MKI (NATO reporting name: Flanker-H) is a twinjet multirole air superiority fighter developed by Russia's Sukhoi and built under licence by India's Hindustan Aeronautics Limited (HAL) for the Indian Air Force (IAF). A variant of the Sukhoi Su-30, it is a heavy, all-weather, long-range fighter.

Development of the variant started after India signed a deal with Russia in 2000 to manufacture 140 Su-30 fighter jets. The first Russian-made Su-30MKI variant was accepted into the Indian Air Force in 2002, while the first Su-30MKI assembled in India entered service with the IAF in 2004. The IAF has nearly 260 Su-30MKIs in inventory as of January 2020. The Su-30MKI is expected to form the backbone of the Indian Air Force's fighter fleet to 2020 and beyond.

The aircraft is tailor-made for Indian specifications and integrates Indian systems and avionics as well as French and Israeli sub-systems. It has abilities similar to the Sukhoi Su-35 with which it shares many features and components.

Development

Origins and acquisition
The Su-30MKI was designed by Russia's Sukhoi Corporation beginning in 1995 and built under licence by India's Hindustan Aeronautics Limited (HAL). The Su-30MKI is derived from the Sukhoi Su-27 and has a fusion of technology from the Su-37 demonstrator and Su-30 program, being more advanced than the baseline Su-30. Russia's Defence Ministry was impressed with the type's performance envelope and ordered 30 Su-30SMs, a localised Su-30MKI, for the Russian Air Force. It features state of the art avionics developed by Russia, India and Israel for display, navigation, targeting and electronic warfare; France and South Africa provided other avionics.

After two years of evaluation and negotiations, on 30 November 1996, India signed a US$1.462 billion deal with Sukhoi for 50 Russian-produced Su-30MKIs in five batches. The first batch were eight Su-30Ks, the basic export version of Su-30 (designated Su-30MKI-I by India). The second batch of 10 were also Su-30Ks, but equipped with French and Israeli avionics (designated Su-30MKI-I by India). The third batch were to be 10 Su-30MKIs featuring canard foreplanes. The fourth batch of 12 Su-30MKIs and fifth batch of 10 Su-30MKIs were to have the AL-31FP turbofans. Initially, the Su-30Ks were to be upgraded to final Su-30MKI configuration but were instead returned to Russia between 2007 to 2011.

In October 2000, a memorandum of understanding (MoU) was signed for Indian licence-production of 140 Su-30MKIs; in December 2000, a deal was sealed at Russia's Irkutsk aircraft plant for full technology transfer. The Indian Air Force (IAF) has ordered 272 aircraft, of which 50 were to be delivered by Russia in 2002-2004 and 2007. The rest of 222 planes are to be produced under license at HAL's Indian facilities in 2004. The first Nasik-built Su-30MKIs were to be delivered by 2004, with staggered production until 2017–18. In November 2002, the delivery schedule was expedited with production to be completed by 2015. An estimated 920 AL-31FP turbofans are to be manufactured at HAL's Koraput Division, while the mainframe and other accessories are to be manufactured at HAL's Lucknow and Hyderabad divisions. Final integration and test flights of the aircraft are carried out at HAL's Nasik Division. Four manufacturing phases were outlined with progressively increasing Indian content: Phase I, II, III and IV. In phase I, HAL manufactured the Su-30MKIs from knocked-down kits, transitioning to semi knocked-down kits in phase II and III; in phase IV, HAL produced aircraft from scratch from 2013 onwards.

In 2007, another order of 40 Su-30MKIs was placed. In 2009, the planned fleet strength was to be 230 aircraft. In 2008, Samtel HAL Display Systems (SHDS), a joint venture between Samtel Display Systems and HAL, won a contract to develop and manufacture multi-function avionics displays for the MKI. A helmet mounted display, Topsight-I, based on technology from Thales and developed by SHDS will be integrated on the Su-30MKI in the next upgrade. In March 2010, it was reported that India and Russia were discussing a contract for 42 more Su-30MKIs. In June 2010, it was reported that the Cabinet Committee on Security had cleared the  deal and that the 42 aircraft would be in service by 2018.

By August 2010, the cost increased to $4.3 billion or $102 million each. This increased unit cost compared to the previous unit cost of $40 million in 2007, has led to the rumours that these latest order of 42 Su-30MKIs are for the Strategic Forces Command (SFC) and these aircraft will be optimised and hardwired for nuclear weapons delivery. The SFC had previously submitted a proposal to the Indian Defence Ministry for setting up two dedicated squadrons of fighters consisting of 40 aircraft capable of delivering nuclear weapons.

HAL expected that indigenisation of the Su-30MKI programme would be completed by 2010; V. Balakrishnan, general manager of the Aircraft Manufacturing Division stated that "HAL will achieve 100 per cent indigenisation of the Sukhoi aircraft – from the production of raw materials to the final plane assembly". As of 2017, HAL manufactures more than 80% of the aircraft. On 11 October 2012, the Indian Government confirmed plans to buy another 42 Su-30MKI aircraft. On 24 December 2012, India ordered assembly kits for 42 Su-30MKIs by signing a deal during President Putin's visit to India. This increases India's order total to 272 Su-30MKIs.

In June 2018, India has reportedly decided not to order any further Su-30s as they feel its cost of maintenance is very high compared to Western aircraft.

In June 2020, India decided to place an order for 12 more Su-30MKI aircraft along with 21 MiG-29s. The Su-30MKI order is to compensate for losses due to crashes to maintain the sanctioned strength of 272 Su-30MKIs. The MiG-29 order was placed to form a fourth MiG-29 squadron to bolster depleted IAF strength. The MiGs were ordered despite being an older platform since they were deliverable within a 2-3-year timeframe, because they were built for an order that was previously canceled and since they were very reasonably priced compared to newer aircraft.

Upgrades

In 2004, India signed a deal with Russia to domestically produce the Novator K-100 missile, designed to shoot down airborne early warning and control (AEW&C) and C4ISTAR aircraft, for the Su-30MKI. Although not initially designed to carry nuclear or strategic weapons, India has considered integrating an air-launched version of the nuclear-capable Nirbhay.

In May 2010, India Today reported that Russia had won a contract to upgrade 40 Su-30MKIs with new radars, onboard computers, electronic warfare systems and the ability to carry the BrahMos cruise missile. The first two prototypes with the "Super-30" upgrade will be delivered to the IAF in 2012, after which the upgrades will be performed on the last batch of 40 production aircraft. The Brahmos missile integrated on the Su-30MKI will provide the capability to attack ground targets from stand-off ranges of around 300 km. On 25 June 2016, HAL conducted the first test flight of a Su-30MKI fitted with a BrahMos-A missile from Nashik, India. The first air launch of BrahMos from a Su-30MKI was successfully carried out on 22 November 2017.

India was planning to upgrade its Su-30MKI fighters with Russian Phazotron Zhuk-AE Active electronically scanned array (AESA) radars. The X band radar can track 30 aerial targets in the track-while-scan mode and engage six targets simultaneously in attack mode. AESA technology offers improved performance and reliability compared with traditional mechanically scanned array radars.

The Indian Defence Ministry proposed several upgrades for the Su-30MKI to the Indian Parliament, including the fitting of Russian Phazotron Zhuk-AE AESA radars starting in 2012. During MMRCA trials the Zhuk-AE AESA radar demonstrated significant capabilities, including ground-mapping modes and the ability to detect and track aerial targets. At the 2011 MAKS air-show, Irkut chairman Alexy Fedorov offered an upgrade package with an improved radar, and reduced radar signature to the Indian fleet to make them "Super Sukhois".

In 2012, upgrades of the earlier 80 Su-30MKIs involves equipping them with stand-off missiles with a range of 300 km; a request for information (ROI) was issued for such weapons. In 2011, India issued a request for information to MBDA for the integration of the Brimstone ground attack missile and the long-range Meteor air-to-air missile.

In February 2017, it was reported that the planes would be upgraded with AL-41F turbofan engines, same as the ones on Sukhoi Su-35.

India is planning to increase Su-30MKIs BVR engagement capability by arming its entire fleet with the indigenous Astra BVR missile having a range of 110 km and Israeli Derby after it was found that the R-77 active-radar homing BVR missile has inadequate performance. In September 2019, the Astra was in multiple user-trials by Indian Air Force to validate its lethality for the Su-30MKI.

Design

Characteristics
The Su-30MKI is a highly integrated twin-finned aircraft. The airframe is constructed of titanium and high-strength aluminium alloys. The engine intake ramps and nacelles are fitted with trouser fairings to provide a continuous streamlined profile between the nacelles and the tail beams. The fins and horizontal tail consoles are attached to tail beams. The central beam section between the engine nacelles consists of the equipment compartment, fuel tank and the brake parachute container. The fuselage head is of semi-monocoque construction and includes the cockpit, radar compartments and the avionics bay.

Su-30MKI aerodynamic configuration is a longitudinal triplane with relaxed stability. The canard increases the aircraft lift ability and deflects automatically to allow high angle of attack (AoA) flights allowing it to perform Pugachev's Cobra. The integral aerodynamic configuration combined with thrust vectoring results in extremely capable manoeuvrability, taking off and landing characteristics. This high agility allows rapid deployment of weapons in any direction as desired by the crew. The canard notably assists in controlling the aircraft at large angles-of-attack and bringing it to a level flight condition. The aircraft has a fly-by-wire (FBW) with quadruple redundancy. Dependent on flight conditions, signals from the control stick position transmitter or the FCS may be coupled to remote control amplifiers and combined with feedback signals from acceleration sensors and rate gyros. The resultant control signals are coupled to the high-speed electro-hydraulic actuators of the elevators, rudders and the canard. The output signals are compared and, if the difference is significant, the faulty channel is disconnected. FBW is based on a stall warning and barrier mechanism which prevents stalls through dramatic increases of control stick pressure, allowing a pilot to effectively control the aircraft without exceeding the angle of attack and acceleration limitations. Although the maximum angle of attack is limited by the canards, the FBW acts as an additional safety mechanism.

The Su-30MKI has a range of 3,000 km with internal fuel which ensures a 3.75 hour combat mission. Also, it has an in-flight refueling (IFR) probe that retracts beside the cockpit during normal operation. The air refueling system increases the flight duration up to 10 hours with a range of 3,000 km combat radius. Su-30MKIs can also use the Cobham 754 buddy refueling pods.

The Su-30MKI's radar cross-section (RCS) is reportedly from 4 to 20 square metres.

Cockpit
The displays include a customised version of the Israeli Elbit Su 967 head-up display (HUD) consisting of bi-cubic phase conjugated holographic displays and seven multifunction liquid-crystal displays, six 127 mm × 127 mm and one 152 mm × 152 mm. Flight information is displayed on four LCD displays which include one for piloting and navigation, a tactical situation indicator, and two for display systems information including operating modes and overall status. Variants of this HUD have also been chosen for the IAF's Mikoyan MiG-27 and SEPECAT Jaguar upgrades for standardisation. The rear cockpit has a larger monochrome display for air-to-surface missile guidance.

The Su-30MKI on-board health and usage monitoring system (HUMS) monitors almost every aircraft system and sub-system, and can also act as an engineering data recorder. From 2010, indigenously designed and built HUDs and Multi-Function Displays (MFD) were produced by the Delhi-based Samtel Group Display Systems.

The crew are provided with zero-zero NPP Zvezda K-36DM ejection seats. The rear seat is raised for better visibility. The cockpit is provided with containers to store food and water reserves, a waste disposal system and extra oxygen bottles. The K-36DM ejection seat is inclined at 30°, to help the pilot resist aircraft accelerations in air combat.

Avionics
The forward-facing NIIP N011M Bars (Panther) is a powerful integrated passive electronically scanned array radar. The N011M is a digital multi-mode dual frequency band radar. The N011M can function in air-to-air and air-to-land/sea mode simultaneously while being tied into a high-precision laser-inertial or GPS navigation system. It is equipped with a modern digital weapons control system as well as anti-jamming features. N011M has a 400 km search range and a maximum 200 km tracking range, and 60 km in the rear hemisphere. The radar can track 15 air targets and engage 4 simultaneously. These targets can even include cruise missiles and motionless helicopters. The Su-30MKI can function as a mini-AWACS as a director or command post for other aircraft. The target co-ordinates can be transferred automatically to at least four other aircraft. The radar can detect ground targets such as tanks at 40–50 km. The Bars radar will be replaced by Zhuk-AESA in all Su-30MKI aircraft.

OLS-30 laser-optical Infra-red search and track includes a day and night FLIR capability and is used in conjunction with the helmet mounted sighting system. The OLS-30 is a combined IRST/LR device using a cooled, broad waveband sensor. Detection range is up to 90 km, while the laser ranger is effective to 3.5 km. Targets are displayed on the same LCD display as the radar. Israeli LITENING targeting pod is used to target laser guided munitions. The original Litening pod includes a long range FLIR, a TV camera, laser spot tracker to pick up target designated by other aircraft or ground forces, and an electro-optical point and inertial tracker, which enables engagement of the target even when partly obscured by clouds or countermeasures; it also integrates a laser range-finder and flash-lamp powered laser designator for the delivery of laser-guided bombs, cluster and general-purpose bomb.

The aircraft is fitted with a satellite navigation system (A-737 GPS compatible), which permits it to make flights in all weather, day and night. The navigation complex includes the high accuracy SAGEM Sigma-95 integrated global positioning system and ring laser gyroscope inertial navigation system. Phase 3 of further development of the MKI, will integrate avionic systems being developed for the Indo-Russian Fifth Generation Fighter Aircraft programme.

Sukhoi Su-30MKI has electronic counter-measure systems. The RWR system is of Indian design, developed by India's DRDO, called Tarang, (Wave in English). It has direction finding capability and is known to have a programmable threat library. The RWR is derived from work done on an earlier system for India's MiG-23BNs known as the Tranquil, which is now superseded by the more advanced Tarang series. Elta EL/M-8222 a self-protection jammer developed by Israel Aircraft Industries is the MKI's standard EW pod, which the Israeli Air Force uses on its F-15s. The ELTA El/M-8222 Self Protection Pod is a power-managed jammer, air-cooled system with an ESM receiver integrated into the pod. The pod contains an antenna on the forward and aft ends, which receive the hostile RF signal and after processing deliver the appropriate response.

Propulsion
The Su-30MKI is powered by two Lyulka-Saturn AL-31FP turbofans, each rated at 12,500 kgf (27,550 lbf) of full after-burning thrust, which enable speeds of up to Mach 2 in horizontal flight and a rate of climb of 230 m/s. The mean time between overhaul is reportedly 1,000 hours with a full-life span of 3,000 hours; the titanium nozzle has a mean time between overhaul of 500 hours. In early 2015, Defence Minister Manohar Parrikar stated before Parliament that the AL-31FP had suffered numerous failures, between the end of 2012 and early 2015, a total of 69 Su-30MKI engine-related failures had occurred; commons causes were bearing failures due to metal fatigue and low oil pressure, in response several engine modifications were made to improve lubrication, as well as the use of higher quality oil and adjustments to the fitting of bearings.

The Su-30MKI's AL-31FP powerplant built on the earlier AL-31FU, adding two-plane thrust vectoring nozzles are mounted 32 degrees outward to longitudinal engine axis (i.e. in the horizontal plane) and can be deflected ±15 degrees in one plane. The canting allows the aircraft to produce both roll and yaw by vectoring each engine nozzle differently; this allows the aircraft to create thrust vectoring moments about all three rotational axes, pitch, yaw and roll. Engine thrust is adjusted via a conventional engine throttle lever as opposed to a strain-gauge engine control stick. The aircraft is controlled by a standard control stick. The pilot can activate a switch for performing difficult maneuvers; while this is enabled, the computer automatically determines the deflection angles of the swiveling nozzles and aerodynamic surfaces.

Operational history

The Sukhoi Su-30MKI is the most potent fighter jet in service with the Indian Air Force in the late 2000s. The MKIs are often fielded by the IAF in bilateral and multilateral air exercises. India exercised its Su-30MKIs against the Royal Air Force's Tornado ADVs in October 2006. This was the first large-scale bilateral aerial exercise with any foreign air force during which the IAF used its Su-30MKIs extensively. This exercise was also the first in 43 years with the RAF. During the exercise, the RAF Air Chief Marshal Glenn Torpy was given permission by the IAF to fly the MKI. RAF's Air Vice Marshal, Christopher Harper, praised the MKI's dogfight ability, calling it "absolutely masterful in dogfights".

In July 2007, the Indian Air Force fielded the Su-30MKI during the Indra-Dhanush exercise with Royal Air Force's Eurofighter Typhoon. This was the first time that the two fighters took part in such an exercise. The IAF did not allow their pilots to use the radar of the MKIs during the exercise so as to protect the highly classified N011M Bars radar system. Also in the exercise were RAF Tornado F3s and a Hawk.  RAF Tornado pilots were candid in their admission of the Su-30MKI's superior manoeuvring in the air, and the IAF pilots were impressed by the Typhoon's agility.

In 2004, India sent Su-30MKs, an earlier variant of the Su-30MKI, to take part in war games with the United States Air Force (USAF) during Cope India 04. The results have been widely publicised, with the Indians winning "90% of the mock combat missions" against the USAF's F-15C. The parameters of the exercise heavily favored the IAF; none of the six 3rd Wing F-15Cs were equipped with the newer long-range, active electronically scanned array (AESA) radars and, at India's request, the U.S. agreed to mock combat at 3-to-1 odds and without the use of simulated long-range, radar-guided AIM-120 AMRAAMs for beyond-visual-range kills.  In Cope India 05, the Su-30MKIs reportedly beat the USAF's F-16s.

In July 2008, the IAF sent 6 Su-30MKIs and 2 Il-78MKI aerial-refueling tankers, to participate in the Red Flag exercise. The IAF again did not allow their pilots to use the radar of the MKIs during the exercise so as to protect the highly classified N011M Bars. In October 2008, a video surfaced on the internet which featured a USAF colonel, Terrence Fornof, criticising Su-30MKI's performance against the F-15C, engine serviceability issues, and high friendly kill rate during the Red Flag exercise. Several of his claims were later rebutted by the Indian side and the USAF also distanced itself from his remarks.

In June 2010, India and France began the fourth round of their joint air exercises, "Garuda", at the Istres Air Base in France. During Garuda, the IAF and the French Air Force were engaged in various missions ranging from close combat engagement of large forces, slow mover protection, protecting and engaging high value aerial assets. This exercise marked the first time the Su-30MKI took part in a military exercise in France.

The Indian Air Force first took part in the United States Air Force's Red Flag exercise in 2008.  Participating in Red Flag costs the IAF  100 crore (US$17.5 million) each time. To reduce costs, the IAF decided to take part once every five years.  The IAF is taking part in the Red Flag exercise in July 2013, at Nellis Air Force Base, Nevada, United States. For the exercise, it is dispatching eight Su-30MKIs, two Lockheed C-130J Hercules tactical aircraft, two Ilyushin Il-78 (NATO reporting name "Midas") mid-air refueling tankers, one Ilyushin Il-76 (NATO reporting name "Candid") heavy-lift aircraft, and over 150 personnel.

The IAF again fielded its MKIs in the Garuda-V exercise with France in June 2014, where they manoeuvred in mixed groups with other IAF aircraft and French Rafales.

On 21 July 2015, India and UK began the bilateral exercise named Indradhanush with aircraft operating from three Royal Air Force bases. The exercises included both Beyond Visual Range (BVR) and Within Visual Range (WVR) exercises between the Su-30MKI and Eurofighter Typhoon. Indian media reported the results were in favour of the IAF with a score of 12–0 at WVR engagements. They also claim that the IAF Su-30MKIs held an edge over the Typhoons in BVR engagements though not in as dominating a manner. The RAF issued a statement that the results being reported by the Indian media did not reflect the results of the exercise. According to Aviation International News In close combat, thrust vector control on the Flankers more than compensated for the greater thrust-to-weight ratio of the Typhoon.

On 26 February 2019, four Sukhoi Su-30MKIs escorted Mirage 2000s into the Pakistani airspace for the Balakot airstrike on an alleged Jaish-e-Mohammed camp. The following day, two Su-30MKIs on combat air patrol were reportedly attacked by multiple Pakistani F-16s using AMRAAM missiles. The missiles were successfully dodged according to India. The debris of an AMRAAM missile was later recovered and displayed by the IAF to disprove the Pakistani claim of not using the F-16. Pakistani media claimed that PAF had downed an Indian Sukhoi Su-30MKI in the aerial skirmish. The Indian Air Force stated that all dispatched Sukhoi aircraft returned safely with the only confirmed loss was a MiG-21. On 8 October 2019, during the Indian Air Force Day celebrations, the IAF reportedly flew the Su-30MKI that Pakistan claimed to have shot down.

On 18 March 2022, it was reported that India ordered 12 Su-30MKIs. In May 2022, the Indian government suspended the Su-30MKI order due to concerns over Moscow's ability to deliver parts to Hindustan Aeronautics and issues related to payment transfers.

Operators

 Indian Air Force – 261 in inventory, 11 crashed, 12 more planned.
Bareilly AFS: 15 Wing
No. 8 Squadron IAF (Eight Pursoots)
No. 24 Squadron IAF (Hawks)
 Chabua AFS: 14 Wing
No. 102 Squadron IAF (Trisonics)
 Halwara AFS: 9 Wing
No. 220 Squadron IAF (Desert Tigers)
No. 221 Squadron IAF (Valiants)
 Jodhpur AFS: 32 Wing
No. 31 Squadron IAF (Lions)
 Lohegaon AFS: 2 Wing
No. 20 Squadron IAF (Lightnings)
No. 30 Squadron IAF (Rhinos)
 Sirsa AFS: 45 Wing
No. 15 Squadron IAF (Flying Lancers)
 Tezpur AFS: 11 Wing
No. 2 Squadron IAF (Winged Arrows)
No. 106 Squadron IAF (Lynxes)
 Maharajpur AFS: 40 Wing
TACDE
 Thanjavur AFS: 47 Wing
No. 222 Squadron IAF (Tigersharks)

Accidents and incidents
, eleven Su-30MKIs had been lost to crashes since the introduction of aircraft in 2000.

Specifications (Su-30MKI)

See also

References

Notes

Citations

Bibliography

External links

Amateur website about Su-30MKI
Core Avionics for Su-30MKI

Canard aircraft
HAL aircraft
1980s Soviet fighter aircraft
2000s Indian fighter aircraft
Su-30MKI
Twinjets
Three-surface aircraft
India–Russia relations
Aircraft first flown in 1997
Twin-tail aircraft